Giovanni Lonfernini (born 2 October 1976) was captain regent of San Marino for the semester from October 2003 to March 2004.  He is of the Sammarinese Christian Democratic Party, and his co-captain-regent was Valeria Ciavatta.

Lonfernini was the second captain regent of this name, the previous one having served in 1934, 1937, and 1941; see List of Captains Regent of San Marino.

References

External links
Speech by G. Lonfernini

1976 births
Living people
Captains Regent of San Marino
Members of the Grand and General Council
Sammarinese Christian Democratic Party politicians